Neepawa was a federal electoral district in Manitoba, Canada, that was represented in the House of Commons of Canada from 1917 to 1949.

This riding was created in 1914 from parts of Dauphin and Portage la Prairie  ridings.

It was abolished in 1947 when it was redistributed into Brandon, Dauphin, Marquette and Portage—Neepawa  ridings.

Members of Parliament

This riding elected the following Members of Parliament:

Fred Langdon Davis, Unionist (1917–1921)
Robert Milne, Progressive (1921–1925)
Thomas Gerow Murphy, Conservative (1925–1926)
Robert Milne, Progressive (1926–1930)
Thomas Gerow Murphy, Conservative (1930–1935)
Frederick Donald Mackenzie, Liberal (1935–1945)
John Bracken, Progressive Conservative (1945–1949)

Election results

By-election: On Mr. Murphy's acceptance of an office of emolument under the Crown, 7 August 1930

See also 

 List of Canadian federal electoral districts
 Past Canadian electoral districts

External links 

Former federal electoral districts of Manitoba